Creatine kinase U-type, mitochondrial, also called ubiquitous mitochondrial creatine kinase (uMtCK), is in humans encoded by CKMT1A gene. CKMT1A catalyzes the reversible transfer of the γ-phosphate group of ATP to the guanidino group of Cr to yield ADP and PCr. The impairment of CKMT1A has been reported in ischaemia, cardiomyopathy, and neurodegenerative disorders. Overexpression of CKMT1A has been reported related with several tumors.

Structure

Gene 

The CKMT1A gene lies on the chromosome location of 15q15.3 and consists of 11 exons.

Protein 

CKMT1A consists of 417 amino acids and weighs 47037Da. CKMT1A is rich in amino acids with hydroxyl-containing and basic side chains.

Function 

There are four distinct types of CK subunits in the tissue of mammals, which are expressed species specifically, developmental stage specifically, and tissue specifically. Ubiquitously expressed, CKMT1A is located in the mitochondrial intermembrane space and form both homodimeric and homooctameric molecules that are readily interconvertible. Like all the other CK isoenzymes, CKMT1A catalyzes the reversible transfer of the γ-phosphate group of ATP to the guanidino group of Cr to yield ADP and PCr. According to the “transport” (“shuttle”) hypothesis for the CK system, after synthesis within the mitochondrial matrix, the γ-phosphate group of ATP is transferred by CKMT1A in the mitochondrial intermembrane space to Cr to yield ADP plus PCr.

Clinical significance 

As an enzyme central to cell energetics, CKMT1A is often impaired in pathological situations. CKMT1A is known as a primary target of oxidative and radical-induced molecular damage; and the impairment of CKMT1A has been reported in ischaemia, cardiomyopathy, and neurodegenerative disorders due to the failure in maintaining metabolic homeostasis. Overexpression of uMtCK has been reported for several tumors with poor prognosis and this may be the adaption of cancer cells to maintain the high growth rate.

Interactions 
Leucine-rich repeat kinase
ASB9

References

External links